Henok Mulubrhan (born 11 November 1999 in Asmara) is an Eritrean cyclist, who currently rides for UCI ProTeam .

Major results

2018
 1st  Road race, National Under-23 Road Championships
 Tour de l'Espoir
1st  Mountains classification
1st Stage 4
 Africa Cup
1st Team time trial
4th Time trial
6th Road race
 2nd  Road race, African Under-23 Road Championships
 4th Road race, National Road Championships
 7th Road race, African Road Championships
2019
 1st  Road race, African Under-23 Road Championships
 2nd Tour de Berne
 5th Road race, African Road Championships
 10th Overall La Tropicale Amissa Bongo
2020
 5th Overall La Tropicale Amissa Bongo
 7th Trofeo Città di San Vendemiano
 9th Overall Tour du Rwanda
2021
 2nd Giro del Medio Brenta
 6th Giro dell'Appennino
 7th Overall Giro della Valle d'Aosta
 9th Trofeo Piva
 9th Giro del Belvedere
2022
 African Road Championships
1st  Road race
1st  Team time trial
2nd  Time trial
 4th Time trial, National Road Championships
 5th Overall Tour du Rwanda
 6th Overall Tour of Antalya
2023
 African Road Championships
1st  Road race
2nd  Team time trial
3rd  Time trial
 1st  Overall Tour du Rwanda
1st Stages 3 & 8

References

External links

1999 births
Living people
Eritrean male cyclists
Sportspeople from Asmara
21st-century Eritrean people